Alfonso Arístides Tamay Sánchez (born 13 May 1993) is a Mexican professional footballer who plays as a winger.

Career

Youth
Alfonso Tamay came up through Tigres UANL youth system. He played for the Houston Dynamo in the 2010 SUM U-17 Cup as 'Tamay Sánchez' and led the tournament with four goals in four games. Back with Tigres for the Clausura 2011 Under-17 tournament, he won the goal-scoring title after scoring 17 goals.

In 2013, he was sent out on loan to Puebla, where he won the Copa Pachuca prior to making his league debut with Puebla on January 5, 2014, in a 2–2 draw against Club Universidad Nacional.

Honours
Puebla
Copa MX: Clausura 2015
Supercopa MX: 2015

Atlante
Liga de Expansión MX: Apertura 2021

Mexico Youth
Central American and Caribbean Games: 2014
Pan American Silver Medal: 2015
CONCACAF Olympic Qualifying Championship: 2015

References

External links
 
 
 

1993 births
Living people
Club Puebla players
Liga MX players
Footballers from Quintana Roo
Mexican footballers
Footballers at the 2015 Pan American Games
Pan American Games medalists in football
Pan American Games silver medalists for Mexico
Association football wingers
Medalists at the 2015 Pan American Games